Comau Fjord, also known as Leptepu Fjord, is a fjord that penetrates the mainland of Chile, in Los Lagos Region. It runs in a generally north-south direction from the Gulf of Ancud and is 68 km long. The fjord receives the waters of the Vodudahue River.

See also
Pumalín Park
Huinay
Huequi

References

Fjords of Chile
Bodies of water of Los Lagos Region